This is a listing of all the animated shorts released by Warner Bros. under the Looney Tunes and Merrie Melodies banners between 1960 and 1969.
A total of 147 shorts were released during the 1960s.

1960

1961

1962 
{|class="wikitable sortable"
|-
! scope="col" style="width: 5px;" | #
! scope="col" style="width: 150px;" | Title
! scope="col" style="width: 50px;" | Series
! scope="col" style="width: 100px;" | Director
! scope="col" style="width: 100px;" | Animator
! scope="col" style="width: 200px;" | Characters
! scope="col" style="width: 125px;" | Release date
! scope="col" style="width: 400px;" | Availability
!Notes
|-
|895
|Wet Hare
|LT
|Robert McKimson
|Warren Batchelder,Ted Bonnicksen,Keith Darling,George Grandpré
|Bugs Bunny, Blacque Jacque Shellacque
|
|
 Streaming - Boomerang App
 Streaming - HBO Max (restored)
|
|-
|896
|A Sheep in the Deep
|MM
|Chuck Jones
Co-Director: Maurice Noble
|Bob Bransford,Ken Harris,Tom Ray,Richard Thompson
|Ralph Wolf and Sam Sheepdog
|February 10, 1962
|
 Laserdisc – Looney Tunes: Assorted Nuts: Memorable Supporting Players and Cult Classics From the Looney Tunes Vault
 Streaming - Boomerang App
 Streaming - HBO Max (restored)
|
 Edited into Bugs Bunny's 3rd Movie: 1001 Rabbit Tales in 1982, but removed for future releases
 Last cartoon featuring Sam Sheepdog and Ralph Wolf to be directed by Chuck Jones.
|-
|897
|Fish and Slips
|LT
|Robert McKimson
|Warren Batchelder,Ted Bonnicksen,George Grandpré
|Sylvester, Sylvester Junior
|March 10, 1962
|
 DVD – Looney Tunes Super Stars' Sylvester and Hippety Hopper: Marsupial Mayhem  (restored)
 Streaming - Boomerang App (restored, PAL broadcast master)
 Streaming - HBO Max (restored)
|
 Mel Blanc voices Sylvester and Sylvester Jr.
|-
|898
|Quackodile Tears|MM
|Art Davis
|Gerry Chiniquy,Virgil Ross,Bob Matz,Lee Halpern,Art Leonardi
|Daffy Duck, Honeybunch
|March 31, 1962
|
 VHS – Looney Tunes Video Show Volume 2
 Streaming - Boomerang App
 Streaming - HBO Max (restored)
|
Last cartoon directed by Arthur Davis.
|-
|899
|Crows' Feat|MM
|Friz Freleng
Co-Director: Hawley Pratt
|Gerry Chiniquy,Lee Halpern,Art Leonardi,Bob Matz,Virgil Ross
|Elmer Fudd (silent), Jose & Manuel, Rocket Announcer
|April 21, 1962
|
 DVD – Looney Tunes Super Stars' Foghorn Leghorn & Friends: Barnyard Bigmouth|
 Final classic-era WB theatrical cartoon featuring Elmer Fudd.
 Mel Blanc voices Jose Rocket Announcer
 Tom Holland voices Manuel
|-
|900
|Mexican Boarders|LT
|Friz Freleng
Co-Director: Hawley Pratt
|Gerry Chiniquy,Virgil Ross,Bob Matz,Art Leonardi,Lee Halpern
|Speedy Gonzales, Sylvester, Slowpoke Rodriguez
|May 12, 1962
|
 DVD – Looney Tunes Golden Collection: Volume 4, Disc 3: Speedy Gonzales in a Flash
|
 Edited into Bugs Bunny's 3rd Movie: 1001 Rabbit Tales in 1982
|-
|901
|Bill of Hare|MM
|Robert McKimson
|Keith Darling,Ted Bonnicksen,Warren Batchelder,George Grandpré
|Bugs Bunny, Tasmanian Devil
|June 9, 1962
|
 VHS - Looney Tunes: The Collectors Edition Volume 4: Daffy Doodles
 VHS - Looney Tunes Presents: Taz's Jungle Jams
 VHS, DVD - Stars of Space Jam: Tasmanian Devil
 Blu-ray, DVD – Looney Tunes Platinum Collection: Volume 1, Disc 2
|
|-
|902
|Zoom at the Top|MM
|Chuck Jones
Co-Director: Maurice Noble
|Ken Harris,Richard Thompson,Bob Bransford,Tom Ray
|Wile E. Coyote, Road Runner
|June 30, 1962
|
 VHS – Looney Tunes: The Collector's Edition Volume 15: A Battle of Wits
 Streaming - Boomerang App
 Streaming - HBO Max (restored)
|
|-
|903
|The Slick Chick|LT
|Robert McKimson
|Ted Bonnicksen,Warren Batchelder,George Grandpré,Keith Darling
|Foghorn Leghorn
|July 21, 1962
|
 Digital - Foghorn Leghorn Streaming - Boomerang App
 Streaming - HBO Max (restored)
|
|-
|904
|Louvre Come Back to Me!|LT
|Chuck Jones
Co-Director: Maurice Noble
|Bob Bransford,Ken Harris,Tom Ray,Richard Thompson
|Pepé Le Pew, Felice, Pierre
|August 18, 1962
|
 VHS - The Looney Tunes Video Show, Volume 3
 VHS - Looney Tunes: The Collectors Edition Volume 14: Cartoon Superstars
 DVD – Looney Tunes Super Stars' Pepe Le Pew: Zee Best of Zee Best Streaming - Boomerang App (restored)
|
 Final classic-era WB theatrical cartoon featuring Pepé Le Pew.
 Edited into Daffy Duck's Fantastic Island in 1983
|-
|905
|Honey's Money|MM
|Friz Freleng
|Gerry Chiniquy,Virgil Ross,Bob Matz,Lee Halpern,Art Leonardi
|Yosemite Sam, Honey, The Wealthy Widow, Wentworth
|September 1, 1962
|
 VHS - Yosemite Sam: The Good, The Bad, and The Ornery! Blu-Ray, DVD – Looney Tunes Platinum Collection: Volume 3, Disc 1
 Streaming - Boomerang App
 Streaming - HBO Max (restored)
|
Yosemite Sam's only solo cartoon.
|-
|906
|The Jet Cage|LT
|Friz Freleng
|Gerry Chiniquy,Art Leonardi,Virgil Ross,Lee Halpern,Bob Matz
|Sylvester, Tweety, Granny
|September 22, 1962
|
 Laserdisc – Bugs and Friends - Disc 1: Side 1
 VHS – Looney Tunes Presents: Tweety: Home Tweet Home
 DVD – Saturday Morning Cartoons: The 1960s: Volume 2 (The Road Runner Show episode)
 DVD – I Love Tweety Vol. 1 (Japanese release - Restored and in English)
 Streaming - HBO Max (restored)
|
 First Warner's cartoon with music by William Lava.
|-
|907
|Mother Was a Rooster|MM
|Robert McKimson
|George Grandpré,Keith Darling,Ted Bonnicksen,Warren Batchelder
|Foghorn Leghorn, Barnyard Dawg, Ostrich
|October 20, 1962
|
 Digital - Foghorn Leghorn Streaming - Boomerang App
 Streaming - HBO Max (restored)
|
 Final released cartoon scored by Milt Franklyn.
|-
|908
|Good Noose|LT
|Robert McKimson
|Warren Batchelder,George Grandpré,Keith Darling,Ted Bonnicksen,Harry Love (effects)
|Daffy Duck, Captain, Mr. Tristan
|November 10, 1962
|
 Streaming - Boomerang App
|
 All Voices are provided by Mel Blanc
|-
|909
|Shishkabugs|LT
|Friz Freleng
|Gerry Chiniquy,Virgil Ross,Bob Matz,Lee Halpern,Art Leonardi
|Bugs Bunny, Yosemite Sam, Spoiled King
|December 8, 1962
|
 Streaming - Boomerang App
 Blu-ray/Digial - Looney Tunes: Bugs Bunny 80th Anniversary Collection, Disc 3
 Streaming - HBO Max (restored)
|
|-
|910
|Martian Through Georgia|LT
|Chuck Jones & Abe Levitow
Co-Director: Maurice Noble
|Tom Ray,Ken Harris,Richard Thompson,Bob Bransford
|Martian
|December 29, 1962
|
 DVD – Looney Tunes Golden Collection: Volume 6, Disc 4: Most Requested Assorted Nuts and One-Shots
|
 Only cartoon to be produced by both John Burton, Sr. and David H. DePatie.
|}

 1963 
Warner Bros. Cartoons shuts down

 1964 
DePatie–Freleng Enterprises takes over after the 10th cartoon

 1965 
 All cartoons except Cats and Bruises star either Daffy or Wile E. and Road Runner.
 All cartoons directed by Rudy Larriva are produced by Format Productions.

 1966 
 All Daffy and Speedy cartoons are directed by Robert McKimson.
 All Wile E. and Road Runner cartoons are directed by Rudy Larriva except Sugar and Spies, which is directed by Robert McKimson.

 1967 
 In 1967, Seven Arts, which had just acquired Warner Bros., brought cartoon production in-house, with William L. Hendricks as producer and Alex Lovy as director.
 All cartoons, except for Cool Cat and Merlin the Magic Mouse, co-star Daffy and Speedy.
 All cartoons produced by Format Productions are directed by Rudy Larriva.
 DFE cartoons are directed by Robert McKimson.
 All cartoons after the fourth one this year are directed by Alex Lovy at Warner Bros.-Seven Arts Animation.

 1968 
 All cartoons directed by Alex Lovy except Bunny and Claude.
 Blue Ribbon re-releases ended this year.

 1969 
 All cartoons directed by Robert McKimson. Warner Bros.-Seven Arts Animation shut down in 1969 when Kinney National Company acquired Warner Bros.-Seven Arts. Injun Trouble was the final WB cartoon until 1980, when Warner Bros. reopened its animation department.

 Further reading 
 Looney Tunes and Merrie Melodies: A Complete Illustrated Guide to the Warner Bros. Cartoons, by Jerry Beck and Will Friedwald (1989), Henry Holt, 
 Chuck Amuck: The Life and Times of an Animated Cartoonist by Chuck Jones, published by Farrar Straus & Giroux, 
 That's Not All, Folks! My Life in the Golden Days of Cartoons and Radio by Mel Blanc, Philip Bashe. Warner Books,  (Softcover)  (Hardcover)
 Of Mice and Magic: A History of American Animated Cartoons'' by Leonard Maltin, revised edition 1987, Plume  (Softcover)  (Hardcover)

See also 
 Looney Tunes
 Merrie Melodies
 Looney Tunes Golden Collection

References

External links 
 
 The Big Cartoon DataBase entry for Merrie Melodies Cartoons and for Looney Tunes Cartoons
 Golden Age Cartoons' The Ultimate Looney Tunes and Merrie Melodies Website by Jon Cooke
 "Warner Brothers Cartoon Companion", a wealth of trivia about the Warner cartoons

1960s in American cinema
 
 
Warner Bros. Cartoons